The National Aeronaval Service of Panama, also called SENAN (abbreviation for ), is a branch of the Panamanian Public Forces which is responsible for carrying out naval and air operations. Its role is to perform protection, surveillance, security and defense of the air and maritime jurisdictional areas. The service has approximately 2,500 personnel, with 45 boats and approximately 40 aircraft.

Introduction 

The SENAN is the result of a merger between the former National Maritime Service and the National Air Service of Panama in 2008. The unit was created as civilian police forces and component of the Public Forces attached to Ministry of Public Security, protect rights and freedoms of people, maintain public order, prevent and investigate crimes, and protect the air and maritime jurisdictional areas, thus contributing to public policy, humanitarian relief and facilitating an environment for development social and economic development of Panama.

According to the national law, the SENAN will act as a public security entity in the maritime, air, port and airport areas throughout the national territory, by performing the following functions:

Organisation
The organisation of SENAN consist of:
 Political-Director Level
 Director General as head of SENAN.
 Deputy Director General, along with Director General are appointed by President of Panama with recommendation of Ministry of Public Security.
 Advisory Level : General Directory, General Inspectorate, General Secretariat and Legal Department.
 Investigator Level : Internal Auditor and Internal Affairs.
 Auxiliary Support Level : National Directorate of Comprehensive Action, National Directorate of Human Resources, National Directorate of Logistics and General Services, National Directorate of Administration and Finances, National Directorate of Aerial Maintenance, National Directorate of Naval Maintenance and National Directorate of Teaching.
 Operational Level : National Directorate of Intelligence, National Directorate of Operations, National Directorate of Technology, National Directorate of Territorial Surveillance and three Aeronaval Region.

Base
The SENAN's bases and stations are located within three region of Aeronaval.

Personnel
As of 2018, SENAN personnel consist of approximately 3,800 sworn officers and 200 administrative personnel. Sworn officers perform SENAN tasks and missions, while administrative personnel only conduct administrative and technical functions.

Sworn offices are consist of following levels:

Commissioned officer ranks

Other ranks

As branch of Public Forces, SENAN personnel can be transferred to another police service according to service needs and vice versa.

Equipment

Aircraft

Vessels

References

External links
 SENAN website
 

Military of Panama